Philip Yung Tsz-kwong is a Hong Kong film director, screenwriter, and critic.

Yung won the Hong Kong Film Award for Best Screenplay at the 35th Hong Kong Film Awards for his film Port of Call (2015).

Early life 
Philip Yung Tsz-kwong grew up in a self-described "lower-class environment".

Career 
Prior to his work as a filmmaker, Yung was a film critic.

He made his feature film debut with Glamorous Youth (2009) followed by May We Chat (2013).

His third feature Port of Call (2015), a crime thriller about a detective with eccentric methods, was nominated for and won several awards at various Asian award ceremonies, including 35th Hong Kong Film Awards, 52nd Golden Horse Awards, and the 19th Bucheon Film Awards. Yung personally won the Best of Bucheon Award at the Bucheon Film Awards and Best Screenplay at the Hong Kong Film Awards.

His next feature Where the Wind Blows is a period crime thriller about corrupt cops in 1960s Hong Kong. Inspired by his grandmother's stories about Old Hong Kong, Yung filmed for around three months beginning in November 2017 what was then entitled Theory Of Ambitions. According to Apple Daily, the film was set to premiere at the end of 2018 but was blocked by the mainland's National Radio and Television Administration due to its subject matter. The film was again scheduled to open at the Hong Kong International Film Festival in April 2021 before being withdrawn due to unspecified "technical reasons", what critics say is a shorthand for censorship by the mainland.

Filmography

Accolades

References

External links 

 

Living people
Hong Kong film directors
Hong Kong writers
Hong Kong film critics
Year of birth missing (living people)